James Donald Putman (November 13, 1922 – June 26, 2006) was an American professional basketball player who spent three seasons in the Basketball Association of America (BAA) and one season in the National Basketball Association (NBA) as a member of the St. Louis Bombers. He attended the University of Colorado.

BAA/NBA career statistics

Regular season

Playoffs

External links

1922 births
2006 deaths
American men's basketball players
Basketball players from Colorado
Colorado Buffaloes men's basketball players
Guards (basketball)
St. Louis Bombers (NBA) players